Chicoreus guillei is a species of sea snail, a marine gastropod mollusk in the family Muricidae, the murex snails or rock snails.

Description

Distribution
This species occurs in the Indian ocean off Réunion

References

 Houart, R., 1985. Report on Muricidae (Gastropoda) recently dredged in the south-western Indian Ocean-I. Description of eight new species. Venus 44(3): 159-171

External links
 MNHN, Paris: holotype

Gastropods described in 1985
Chicoreus